University/65th Street is a side platformed Sacramento RT light rail station in  Sacramento, California, United States. The station was opened on September 5, 1987, is operated by the Sacramento Regional Transit District and is the closest station to California State University, Sacramento. It is served by the Gold Line. The station is located at 65th Street and Folsom Boulevard.

This light rail station is also the first in the Sacramento area to have transit-oriented development constructed surrounding it. The F65 (Folsom Boulevard & 65th street) project includes townhouses and condos. The Upper Eastside Lofts are the newest "dormitories" at the nearby Sacramento State University. Places to eat that are directly connected to the station include Dos Coyotes, Jamba Juice, and Starbucks.

Since September 12, 2013, Megabus offers service from the University/65th Street station to San Francisco. Megabus service used to continue on to Reno and Sparks, NV; this service ended in late 2017.

Platforms and tracks

References

External links
Station profile

Sacramento Regional Transit light rail stations
Railway stations in the United States opened in 1987